Natural horror is a subgenre of horror films that features natural forces, typically in the form of animals or plants, that pose a threat to human characters.

Though killer animals in film have existed since the release of The Lost World in 1925, two of the first motion pictures to garner mainstream success with a "nature run amok" premise were The Birds, directed by Alfred Hitchcock and released in 1963; and Jaws, directed by Steven Spielberg and released in 1975. Following Jaws, numerous horror films of a similar narrative were produced, including Grizzly (1976), Piranha (1978), and Alligator (1980).

Arthropods 
See also the section on insects.

Arachnids 
 Kingdom of the Spiders (1977; tarantulas)
 Arachnophobia (1990; spiders)
 Ticks (1993; giant ticks)
 Eight Legged Freaks (2002; giant spiders)
 Big Ass Spider! (2013; giant spider)
 Lavalantula (2015; giant lava-breathing tarantulas)

Crustaceans 
 The Bay (2012; isopods)

Birds 
 The Birds (1963; flocks of vicious gulls, crows, sparrows and other birds)
 The Birds II: Land's End (1994)
 Beaks: The Movie (1987)
 KAW (2007; ravens)
 Birdemic: Shock and Terror (2010; mutated birds)
 Birdemic 2: The Resurrection (2013; mutated birds)

Fish

Piranhas 
 Piranha (1978; genetically enhanced piranhas)
 Piranha II: The Spawning (1982; mutant piranhas)
 Piranha 3D (2010; prehistoric piranhas)
 Piranha 3DD (2012; prehistoric piranhas)
 Piranha (1995; killer piranhas)

Sharks 

 Jaws (1975; a large great white shark)
 Jaws 2 (1978; a great white shark)	
 Jaws 3 (1983; a great white shark)
 Great White (1981 a.k.a. L'ultimo squalo; a great white shark)
 Deep Blood (1989 a.k.a. Sangue negli abissi; a great white shark) 
 Deep Blue Sea (1999; large genetically engineered shortfin mako sharks)
 Red Water (2003; a bull shark)
 Open Water (2003, Caribbean reef sharks)
 The Reef (2010; a great white shark)
 Shark Night (2011; various species of sharks)
 Bait (2012; two great white sharks)
 Sharknado (2013; swarms of various species of sharks emerging out tornadoes).
 47 Meters Down: Uncaged (2019; cave-dwelling great white sharks)
 Great White (2021; two great white sharks)
 The Requin (2022; a great white shark)

Insects

Ants 
 The Naked Jungle (1954; army ants)
 Them! (1954; giant mutated ants)
 Phase IV (1974; super-intelligent ants of various species)
 Empire of the Ants (1977; large mutated ants)
 It Happened at Lakewood Manor (1977)

Honey bees 
 The Deadly Bees (1966)
 Killer Bees (1974)
 The Savage Bees (1976)
 The Swarm (1978)
 The Bees (1978)
 Deadly Invasion: The Killer Bee Nightmare (1995)

Cockroaches 
 Creepshow (1982, killer cockroaches)
 Mimic (1997, evolved human-sized genetically engineered cockroaches)

Locusts 
 Locusts: The 8th Plague (2005)

Wasps 
 Stung (2015; large mutated wasps)

Mammals

Bats 
 The Devil Bat (1940; mutant bats)
 Nightwing (1979; vampire bats)
 Bats (1999; genetically altered bats)

Bears 
 Grizzly (1976; a grizzly bear)
 Prophecy (1979; a mutant bear)
 Grizzly Rage  (2007; a grizzly bear)
 Into the Grizzly Maze (2014; a grizzly bear)
 Backcountry (2014, a black bear)

Canines 
 Dogs (1976; domestic dogs turned into killers)
 The Pack (1977; feral dogs)
 Cujo (1983; a Saint Bernard infected with rabies)
 The Breed (2006; mutated feral dogs)
 Frozen (2010; gray wolves)
 The Pack (2015; feral dogs)

Dolphins 
 Orca (1977; a killer whale)

Felines 
 Black Zoo (1963; lions and tigers)
 Maneater (2007; a Bengal tiger)
 Burning Bright (2010, a tiger)

Pigs 
 Pigs (1973)
 Razorback (1984; a huge wild boar)
 Pig Hunt (2008; a boar)

Primates 
 Blood Monkey (2007)
 Shakma (1990)
  Monkey Shines (1988)

Rats 
 Willard (1971)
Ben (1972)
 Deadly Eyes (1982; a.k.a. The Rats)
 Graveyard Shift (1990)
 Willard (2003)

Others 
 Night of the Lepus (1972; giant rabbits)
 Black Sheep (2006; genetically engineered killer sheep)

Mollusks

Gastropods 
 Slugs (1988; abnormally large killer black slugs)

Octopuses and Squids 
 Bride of the Monster (1955; a killer octopus)
 Tentacles (1977; a giant octopus)
 Octopus (2000, a giant octopus)

Reptiles

Alligators and crocodiles 

 The Great Alligator River (1979; an alligator god)
 Alligator (1980; an abnormally large American alligator)
 Alligator II: The Mutation (1991; a mutant alligator)
 Dark Age (1986; a monstrous crocodile God called Numunwari)
 Killer Crocodile (1989, mutated large crocodile)

 Lake Placid (1999; an abnormally large saltwater crocodile)
 Lake Placid 2 (2007)
 Lake Placid 3 (2010)
 Lake Placid: The Final Chapter (2012)
 Crocodile (2000; an abnormally large Nile crocodile)
 Blood Surf (2001; a monstrous giant crocodile)
 Black Water (2007; a saltwater crocodile)
 Croc (2007; a saltwater crocodile)
 Primeval (2007; Gustave)
 Rogue (2007; a giant saltwater crocodile)
 Crawl (2019; several American alligators)

Snakes 

 Rattlers (1976)
 Anaconda (1997)
 Anacondas: The Hunt for the Blood Orchid (2004)
 Anaconda 3: Offspring (2008)
 Anacondas: Trail of Blood (2009)
 King Cobra (1999)
 Silent Predators (1999; rattlesnakes)
 Snakes on a Plane (2006)
 Mega Snake (2007)

Plants 
 Little Shop of Horrors (1960; mutant Venus flytrap)
 The Day of the Triffids (1962; man-eating plants)
 Attack of the Killer Tomatoes (1978; killer tomatoes)
 The Ruins (2008; vines)

Worms 
 Attack of the Giant Leeches (1959, giant leeches)
 Squirm (1976, bloodworms and sandworms)
 Blood Beach (1982; a giant worm)

Miscellaneous 
 Godzilla (1954; a giant irradiated Godzillasaurus)
 Frogs (1972; various species of animals)
 The Food of the Gods (1976; various species of animals)
 Day of the Animals (1977; various species of animals)

See also 
 List of disaster films
 List of eco-horror films
 List of films featuring giant monsters

References 

 
Natural